Perry Publishing and Broadcasting is a print media, local cable television show producer and radio broadcasting group based in Oklahoma City, Oklahoma, targeting the local African American community. Russell M. Perry is the owner and president of the company.

Company history
Perry Publishing was founded in April 1979 by Russell M. Perry and began publishing the Black Chronicle, Oklahoma's oldest African-American community newspaper, that same month.

In 1993 Perry Publishing acquired its first radio station with the purchase of AM 1140 (now known as KRMP) in Oklahoma City. The station later became KVSP and was the first urban contemporary station in the Oklahoma City market since the early-1990s. With the success of KVSP, Perry soon acquired KJMM in Tulsa. Today the company operates stations in several cities in Oklahoma and has recently (as of August, 2007) acquired Radio One's cluster of stations in Augusta, Georgia.

In 2003 Perry Publishing built a 2,000 ft tower in Caddo County, Oklahoma to move KRPT FM into Oklahoma City making it a Full C in power, a 100,000 watts. KRPT FM call letters were changed to KVSP.

External links
 Perry Publishing and Broadcasting official website
 The Black Chronicle's official website
 Recent article from "Black News" online website about Perry Publishing and Broadcasting acquisition of Radio One's Augusta, Georgia station cluster.

African-American history in Oklahoma City
Radio broadcasting companies of the United States
1979 establishments in Oklahoma